The following list shows NCAA Division I football programs by winning percentage during the 1950–1959 football seasons. During this time Division I was known as the University Division. The following list reflects the records according to the NCAA. This list takes into account results modified later due to NCAA action, such as vacated victories and forfeits.

 

 Chart notes

 San Francisco left Division I after the 1951 season.
 Air Force joined Division I in 1956.
 Loyola Marymount dropped football after the 1951 season.
 North Texas joined Division I in 1953.
 Houston joined Division I in 1951.
 Cincinnati joined Division I in 1954.
 Florida State joined Division I in 1954.
 Washington & Lee left Division I after the 1953 season.
 Fordham left Division I after the 1954 season.
 Drake left Division I after the 1958 season.
 Bradley left Division I after the 1951 season.
 Temple left Division I after the 1952 season.
 Xavier joined Division I in 1959.
 Dayton joined Division I in 1956.
 Santa Clara left Division I after the 1952 season.
 Duquesne left Division I after the 1950 season.
 Northern Arizona left Division I after the 1953 season.
 Saint Mary's left Division I after the 1950 season.
 Georgetown dropped football after the 1950 season.
 NYU dropped football after the 1952 season.
 Nevada left Division I after the 1950 season.

See also
 NCAA Division I FBS football win–loss records
 NCAA Division I football win–loss records in the 1940s
 NCAA Division I football win–loss records in the 1960s

References

Lists of college football team records